Aelurillus galinae is a jumping spider species in the genus Aelurillus that lives in the United Arab Emirates.

References

Salticidae
Spiders of the Arabian Peninsula
Spiders described in 2010
Taxa named by Wanda Wesołowska